Elvira of León may refer to:
 Elvira Menéndez, wife of Ordoño II of León
 Elvira Ramírez, daughter of Ramiro II of León
 Elvira Menéndez, wife of Alfonso V of León
 Elvira of Toro, daughter of Ferdinand I of León and Castile
 Elvira of Castile, Queen of León, wife of Bermudo II of León

See also
Elvira of Castile (disambiguation)